Garmeh and Jajarm is a former county in North Khorasan Province of Iran.

Former counties of Iran
Geography of North Khorasan Province